Articles related to Quebec include:

0–9 

1980 Quebec referendum

1995 Quebec referendum

A

Aboriginal peoples in Quebec

Architecture of Quebec

Autoroute (Quebec)

Loi pour promouvoir la langue française au Québec
An Act to promote the French language in Québec

Anglo-Quebecker

Anglosphere

Anglicism

Association québécoise de linguistique

B

Bibliothèque et Archives nationales du Québec

C

Canadian identity

Canadiens

Cabinet of Quebec

Canada East

Canadiens

Charter of the French Language

Cinema of Quebec

CIREQ

Cirque du Soleil

Civil Code of Quebec

Coalition New Democratic Party of Quebec – Regroupement des militants syndicaux candidates, 1976 Quebec provincial election

Coat of Arms of Quebec

Cuisine of Quebec

Culture of Quebec

Commission royale d’enquête sur le bilinguisme et le biculturalisme Royal Commission on Bilingualism and Biculturalism

D

Demographics of Quebec

Demographic history of Quebec

Demolinguistic descriptors used in Canada

Language demographics of Quebec

Céline Dion

E

Economy of Quebec

English-speaking Quebecers

English Canada

F

Family Compact

Fête nationale du Québec

Federalism in Quebec

Flag of Quebec

Français québécois

French Canada

French Canadians

Francophone

French Canadian

French language in Canada

French-speaking Quebecer

Franglais

Front de libération du Québec (FLQ)

G

Gens du pays

Geography of Quebec

H

History of Quebec

History of Quebec French

Holidays of Quebec

Humor in Quebec

Hydro-Québec

I

J

Joual

K

L

La Francophonie

Laurentian mountains

Languages of Canada

Law on the state education

Legislative Council of Quebec

List of Lieutenant Governors of Quebec

List of National Historic Sites of Canada in Quebec

List of protected areas of Quebec

List of Quebec authors

List of Quebec counties

List of Quebec county regional municipalities

List of Quebec festivals

List of Quebec general elections

List of Quebec leaders of the Opposition

List of Quebec media

List of Quebec premiers

List of Quebec regions

List of Quebec television series

List of Quebec universities

List of Quebecers

List of radio stations in Quebec

List of towns in Quebec

Lower Canada

M

Meech Lake Accord

Municipal history of Quebec

Music of Quebec

N

Name of Quebec City

National Assembly of Quebec

National question (Quebec)

1980 Quebec referendum

1995 Quebec referendum

Nunavik

Nationalisme québécois

O

October Crisis (La crise d'octobre)

Œ

Office québécois de la langue française

Official bilingualism in Canada

P

Parlement Jeunesse du Québec

Linguistic prescription

Plains of Abraham Plaines d'Abraham

Politics of Quebec

Poutine

Premier of Quebec

Q

Québécois/Quebecois(e

Québécois people

QMJHL

Quebec Act

Quebec Charter of Rights and Freedoms

Quebec English

Quebec education system

Quebec folklore

Quebec French

Quebec French lexicon

Quebec French phonology

Quebec French profanity

Quebec Selection Certificate (CSQ)

Quebec sovereigntism

Le Québécois

Quebecer (disambiguation)

Quiet Revolution

Quebec diaspora

Quebec nationalism

R
Ginette Reno

Roman du terroir

Rest of Canada

S
Salon du livre anarchiste

Same-sex marriage in Quebec

Sex (band)

The Social Justice Committee of Montreal

Société d'astronomie de Montréal

Société Radio-Canada

Snowmobile

Standard French

T
Joseph-Charles Taché

Sir Étienne-Paschal Taché

Gabriel-Elzéar Taschereau

Henri-Thomas Taschereau

Jean-Thomas Taschereau (jurist)

Joseph-André Taschereau

Marie-Anne-Louise Taschereau

Thomas-Pierre-Joseph Taschereau

Television of Quebec

U

V

W

X

Y

Z

See also

Index of Canada-related articles

 
Quebec